Santiago "Santi" Moar Sánchez (born 5 September 1993) is a Spanish footballer who plays as a forward for New Mexico United in the USL Championship. Moar is most frequently utilized as a left winger.

Playing career

Youth and college 
Moar played three years of college soccer at Pfeiffer University between 2014 and 2016, including a redshirted year in 2014. He made a total of 45 appearances, scoring 24 goals in his time at Pfeiffer.

While at college, Moar also appeared for Premier Development League side Charlotte Eagles in 2016.

Club

Bethlehem Steel FC
On 17 January 2017, Moar was selected in the fourth round (82nd overall) in the 2017 MLS SuperDraft by Philadelphia Union. On 30 January 2017, Moar signed with Philadelphia's United Soccer League affiliate club Bethlehem Steel FC.

Moar was released by Bethlehem Steel on 19 November 2018.

New Mexico United
On 12 December 2018, Moar was signed by USL Championship expansion club New Mexico United ahead of its inaugural season. Moar earned second team all-league honors for his 11 goal and six assist season.

Phoenix Rising FC
On 3 December 2019, Moar signed with Phoenix Rising FC.

New Mexico United
Moar returned to New Mexico on 19 December 2022, joining the club for an undisclosed transfer fee.

Career statistics

References

External links 

 
 
 Lapreferente profile

1993 births
Living people
Association football forwards
Philadelphia Union II players
Charlotte Eagles players
New Mexico United players
Phoenix Rising FC players
Footballers from Galicia (Spain)
People from Ordes (comarca)
Sportspeople from the Province of A Coruña
Pfeiffer Falcons men's soccer players
Philadelphia Union draft picks
Spanish expatriate footballers
Spanish expatriate sportspeople in the United States
Spanish footballers
USL Championship players
USL League Two players